Asif Khan may refer to:
 Asif Khan (Hong Kong cricketer) (born 1989), Hong Kong cricketer
 Asif Khan (Indian cricketer) (born 1992), Indian cricketer
 Asif Khan (Pakistani cricketer) (born 1990), Pakistani cricketer
 Asif Khan (politician), Pakistani politician
 Asif Hossain Khan, Bangladeshi sport shooter
 Asif Muhammad Khan, Indian politician

See also
 Asaf Khan (disambiguation)